The western black-bridged leaf turtle (Cyclemys atripons) is a species of Asian leaf turtle found in southern Indochina.

Description
The carapace of this species is reddish brown, ovoid to elongated, with or without fine, radiating, black patterns. The plastron is mostly yellow with or without fine, radiating, black lines. The head is speckled and the throat is yellow. The neck is striped. Hatchlings have wide head and neck stripes and  yellow plastrons with large, dark spots. The common name of the species refers to the color of the bridge (the area where the plastron and the carapace meet), which is predominantly yellow with black stripes or entirely black. C. atripons is morphologically almost indistinguishable from C. pulchristiata, the eastern black-bridged leaf turtle.

Distribution 
They are found in Cambodia, East Thailand, and Vietnam (Annam).

See also
Cyclemys

References 

Cyclemys
Turtles of Asia
Reptiles of Southeast Asia
Reptiles of Cambodia
Reptiles of Thailand
Reptiles of Vietnam
Reptiles described in 1997